Pointy ears or pointed ears are a characteristic of numerous animals, at least one genetic disorder in humans, as well as a cliché in popular culture, particularly in the fantasy genre. They are commonly known as elf ears.

Animals

"Pointy ears" is a characteristic of some animals. Some examples are the cat, vampire bats, civets and genets of the viverridae family, red pandas, and African bush pigs.

Humans
One of the characteristics of the Williams syndrome has been described as "pointed ears". There are also cases of people being born with pointed ears not associated to William's syndrome. In one family a woman was born with two pointed ears, she later had a son with two less dramatically pointed ears, and she had a great uncle with one pointed ear. Some cases of pointed ears may be due to trauma to ears during labor, and the ear crease may unfold with time.
The pointed ear(s) in Stahl's ear is caused by misshapen cartilage. It is characterized by an extra horizontal fold of cartilage (crus). Normally, there are two: superior and inferior. In Stahl's ear, there is a third horizontal crus. The helix (or upper portion of the ear) may uncurl, giving the ear a pointed shape.

Author Holly Black and others have worn latex pointy ears in public and some people modify their ears surgically.

Folklore and fiction

Pointy ears have been a characteristic of many creatures in folklore, such as the French croquemitaine, the Brazilian curupira, and the Japanese earth spider.

Pointy or pointed ears have been a feature of characters on art dating back at least to the times of Ancient Greece and medieval Europe.

Pointy ears are a common characteristic of many creatures in the fantasy genre. It's a common characteristics of races such as, among others, elves, faeries, pixies, hobbits, or orcs. They are also a characteristic of creatures from the horror genre, such as vampires.

This characteristic has been adopted into the Japanese anime and manga art style, where pointy ears are also a common trope of fantasy characters. Manga and anime elves in particular are distinguished by very prominently displayed pointed ears, often drawn larger and more distinctly visible, as well as more angled, than in the Western works.

Pointy ears have become associated with elves in Victorian literature of the 19th century. Popularization of the pointed ears as an attribute of elves has been attributed to the works of J. R. R. Tolkien and their more recent big screen interpretation, although the status of elvish ears as canon is not universally accepted by the Tolkien fandom.

Pointy ears are also found in the science fiction genre; for example among the Vulcan and Romulan races of the Star Trek universe or the Nightcrawler character from the X-Men universe.

See also
Elves in fantasy fiction and games
Fantasy tropes and conventions
Donohue syndrome

References

External links

Topics in popular culture
Ear
Fantasy tropes